In enzymology, a 3alpha-hydroxycholanate dehydrogenase is an enzyme that catalyzes the chemical reaction

3alpha-hydroxy-5beta-cholanate + NAD+  3-oxo-5beta-cholanate + NADH + H+

Thus, the two substrates of this enzyme are 3alpha-hydroxy-5beta-cholanate and NAD+, whereas its 3 products are 3-oxo-5beta-cholanate, NADH, and H+.

This enzyme belongs to the family of oxidoreductases, specifically those acting on the CH-OH group of donor with NAD+ or NADP+ as acceptor. The systematic name of this enzyme class is 3alpha-hydroxy-5beta-cholanate:NAD+ oxidoreductase. This enzyme is also called alpha-hydroxy-cholanate dehydrogenase.

Structural studies

As of late 2007, only one structure has been solved for this class of enzymes, with the PDB accession code .

References

 

EC 1.1.1
NADH-dependent enzymes
Enzymes of known structure